Jules Verne was a repair ship of the French Navy, named in honour of science-fiction writer Jules Verne.

Originally named Achéron and intended as an ammunition transport ship, she was converted to repair ship after her keel had been laid.

Jules Verne was long based in Djibouti (she was featured on the 10 000-Djiboutian francs banknote). In 1997, she was assigned to the Force d'Action Navale.

She was designed to replenish, refuel and repair the ships of an operational force at sea. She was fitted with a complete 240-m2 hospital including an operating theatre, a recompression chamber and 16 beds.

References

External links

Auxiliary ships of France
1970 ships
Ships built in France